Lancelot Francis Lawton (28 December 1880 – September 1947) was a British historian, military officer, scholar of Ukrainian studies, activist, and international political journalist who reported from Japan and the Soviet Union. He authored books about the Russian Revolution and the economic history of Soviet Russia. In the early 1930s, he contributed to the formation of pro-Ukrainian public opinion in the British society with his reports and articles about Ukraine. He was one of the founders and active participants in the Anglo-Ukrainian Committee established in 1935.

Life and career 
Lawton was born in Liverpool. He studied at the St Francis Xavier Jesuit college of his hometown. With the outbreak of the Russo-Japanese War broke out, he moved to Tokyo, reporting for The Daily Telegraph.

Lancelot wrote a column Foreign Politics of the Day in the Catholic periodical Dublin Review, beginning in 1911.

Lawton lived in Russia before the First World War, and visited again in 1924. Based on his experiences and collection of information, and assisted  by his wife, Lydia Alexandrovna, who had graduated in political economy and commerce in Saint Petersburg, he published a book The Russian Revolution, 1917–1926 in 1927. It was intended for the general reader, not only for specialists. In the same spirit, he published another book, An Economic History of Soviet Russia in 1932, again assisted by his wife.

Pro-Ukrainian activism 
In the early 1930s, he contributed to the formation of pro-Ukrainian public opinion in the British society with his reports and articles about Ukraine. In 1935, he addressed a committee of the House of Commons in London,  beginning: "The chief problem in Europe to-day is the Ukrainian problem", expanding that the nationality of Ukraine had been suppressed by mighty neighbours. He urged Great Britain to support the Ukrainian movement for independence, and was one of the founders and active participants in the  established in 1935.

Lawton died in Cambridge in September 1947, at age 66.

Legacy 
Some of Lancelot's articles about the status of Ukraine in the 1930s were collected in a book by the Ukrainian historian Serhiy Kot, and published in 2006 in London and Kyiv as Lancelot Lawton, Ukrainian Question. Ланцелот Лоутон Украiнське питання. Kot spent two years tracing Lawton's original articles, held by the Library of Congress in the U.S.

Notes

References

External links 
 Lancelot Lawton House Of Commons 29-May-1935 The Ukrainian Question in 1935 willzuzak.ca
 Anglo-Ukrainian Committee ukrainiansintheuk.info

1880 births
1947 deaths
20th-century British journalists
20th-century English historians
English political journalists
English explorers
Ukrainianists

Writers from Liverpool
The Daily Telegraph people
English columnists